Abu'l-Faraj Muhammad, was an Iranian statesman Fasanjas family who served the Buyid dynasty.

He was the son Abu'l-Fadl al-Abbas ibn Fasanjas, a rich Iranian noble from the Fasanjas family which was native to Shiraz in Fars. He also had a brother named Abu Muhammad al-Fasanjas, whom he along with served as the head of the divan and treasurer. In 966, Mu'izz al-Dawla, the Buyid ruler of Iraq, sent Abu'l-Faraj and another Iranian officer named Abu'l Fadl Abbas ibn Husain Shirazi on an expedition to Oman. After the death of Mu'izz al-Dawla in 967, Abu'l-Faraj returned to Iraq, where he served the latter's successor Izz al-Dawla. He later retired in 970, and died in 981. He had a son named Abu'l-Qasim Jafar, who served as the vizier of the Buyid ruler Sultan al-Dawla.

Sources 
 
 
 

Fasanjas family
981 deaths
10th-century Iranian politicians
People from Shiraz
Buyid officials
Year of birth unknown